Descriptor may refer to:
An identifier

In computer science:
Billing descriptor, the merchant's name that appears on a credit card statement
Short Payment Descriptor, a compact data format for an easy exchange of a payment information using modern electronic channels
Data descriptor, a software or hardware structure describing data
Visual descriptors, a representation of visual features in image or video
Security descriptor, a Windows data structure containing security information
Segment descriptor, used for memory addressing in x86 computer architectures
Index term,  also known as a "descriptor" in information retrieval
File descriptor, an abstract key for accessing a file

In chemistry:
Molecular descriptor, which helps characterize a chemical compound
Descriptor (chemistry), a prefix used to specify a chemical name

In languages:
Epithet, a descriptive term (word or phrase), accompanying or occurring in place of a name and having entered common usage